The 2015 All-Big Ten Conference football team consists of American football players chosen as All-Big Ten Conference players for the 2015 Big Ten Conference football season.  The conference recognizes two official All-Big Ten selectors: (1) the Big Ten conference coaches selected separate offensive and defensive units and named first- and second-team players (the "Coaches" team); and (2) a panel of sports writers and broadcasters covering the Big Ten also selected offensive and defensive units and named first- and second-team players (the "Media" team).

Offensive selections

Quarterbacks
 Connor Cook, Michigan State (Coaches-1; Media-1)
 C. J. Beathard, Iowa (Coaches-2; Media-2)
 Nate Sudfeld, Indiana (Coaches-3; Media-3)

Running backs
 Ezekiel Elliott, Ohio State (Coaches-1; Media-1)
 Jordan Howard, Indiana (Coaches-1; Media-1)
 Justin Jackson, Northwestern (Coaches-2; Media-2)
 Saquon Barkley, Penn State (Coaches-2; Media-2)
 Josh Ferguson, Illinois (Coaches-3; Media-3)
 Jordan Canzeri, Iowa (Coaches-3; Media-3)

Wide receivers
 Aaron Burbridge, Michigan State (Coaches-1; Media-1)
 Alex Erickson, Wisconsin (Coaches-2; Media-1)
 Jehu Chesson, Michigan (Coaches-1)
 Jordan Westerkamp, Nebraska (Coaches-2; Media-2)
 Chris Godwin, Penn State (Coaches-3; Media-2)
 Michael Thomas, Ohio State (Coaches-3; Media-3)
 Leonte Carroo, Rutgers (Media-3)

Centers
 Jack Allen, Michigan State (Coaches-1; Media-1)
 Austin Blythe, Iowa (Coaches-2; Media-2)
 Jacoby Boren, Ohio State (Coaches-3; Media-3)

Guards
 Pat Elflein, Ohio State (Coaches-1; Media-1)
 Jordan Walsh, Iowa (Coaches-1; Media-2)
 Dan Feeney, Indiana (Coaches-2; Media-1)
 Brian Allen, Michigan State (Coaches-2; Media-2)
 Donavon Clark, Michigan State (Coaches-3)
 Billy Price, Ohio State (Coaches-3)
 Ted Karras, Illinois (Media-3)
 Kyle Kalis, Michigan (Media-3)

Tackles
 Jack Conklin, Michigan State (Coaches-1; Media-1)
 Taylor Decker, Ohio State (Coaches-1; Media-1)
 Jason Spriggs, Indiana (Coaches-2; Media-2)
 Alex Lewis, Nebraska (Coaches-2; Media-3)
 Tyler Marz, Wisconsin (Coaches-3; Media-2)
 Erik Magnuson, Michigan (Coaches-3; Media-3)

Tight ends
 Jake Butt, Michigan (Coaches-1; Media-1)
 Dan Vitale, Northwestern (Coaches-2; Media-2)
 Josiah Price, Michigan State (Coaches-3; Media-3)

Defensive selections

Defensive linemen
 Yannick Ngakoue, Maryland (Coaches-1; Media-1)
 Shilique Calhoun, Michigan State (Coaches-1; Media-1)
 Joey Bosa, Ohio State (Coaches-1; Media-1)	
 Carl Nassib, Penn State (Coaches-1; Media-1)
 Malik McDowell, Michigan State (Coaches-2; Media-2)
 Dean Lowry, Northwestern (Coaches-2; Media-2)
 Adolphus Washington, Ohio State (Coaches-2; Media-2)
 Maliek Collins, Nebraska (Coaches-2; Media-3)
 Austin Johnson, Penn State (Coaches-3; Media-2)
 Nate Meier, Iowa (Coaches-3; Media-3)
 Anthony Zettel, Penn State (Coaches-3; Media-3)
 Chris Wormley, Michigan (Coaches-3)
 Deonte Gibson, Northwestern (Media-3)

Linebackers
 Anthony Walker Jr., Northwestern (Coaches-1; Media-1)
 Joe Schobert, Wisconsin (Coaches-1; Media-1)
 Joshua Perry, Ohio State (Coaches-1; Media-2)
 Raekwon McMillan, Ohio State (Coaches-2; Media-1)
 Josey Jewell, Iowa (Coaches-2; Media-2)
 Darron Lee, Ohio State (Coaches-2; Media-3)
 Riley Bullough, Michigan State (Coaches-3; Media-2)
 Vince Biegel, Wisconsin (Coaches-3; Media-3)
 Darien Harris, Michigan State (Coaches-3)
 Steve Longa, Rutgers (Media-3)

Defensive backs
 Desmond King, Iowa (Coaches-1; Media-1)
 Jourdan Lewis, Michigan (Coaches-1; Media-1)
 Jabrill Peppers, Michigan (Coaches-1; Media-1)
 William Likely, Maryland (Coaches-1)
 Vonn Bell, Ohio State (Media-1)

Special teams

Kickers
 Griffin Oakes, Indiana (Coaches-1; Media-1)
 Marshall Koehn, Iowa (Coaches-2)
 Drew Brown, Nebraska (Media-2)
 Ryan Santoso, Minnesota (Coaches-3)
 Kenny Allen, Michigan (Media-3)

Punters
 Sam Foltz, Nebraska (Coaches-1; Media-1)
 Cameron Johnston, Ohio State (Coaches-2; Media-2)
 Peter Mortell, Minnesota (Coaches-3; Media-3)

Return specialist
 William Likely, Maryland (Coaches-1; Media-1)
Janarion Grant, Rutgers (Media-2; Coaches-3)
 Jabrill Peppers, Michigan (Coaches-2)
 Solomon Vault, Northwestern (Media-3)

Key
Bold = Consensus first-team selection by both the coaches and media

Coaches = Selected by the Big Ten Conference coaches

Media = Selected by the conference media

See also
 2015 College Football All-America Team

References

All-Big Ten Conference
All-Big Ten Conference football teams